China Everbright Group is a Chinese state-owned enterprise. Everbright Group was a subsidiary (55.67 percent) of Central Huijin Investment. The Ministry of Finance of China owned the rest of the stake, which Central Huijin acquired on 8 December 2014.

China Everbright Group was ranked 194th in 2021 Fortune Global 500.

History
China Everbright Holdings was established in British Hong Kong in 1983, by three proxy persons for the Government of China: Wang Guangying, Zhang Lansheng and Ren Xiguang, with Wang "owned" most of the shares until 1990, which was transferred to Qiu Qing, the second chairman of the company. Wang was the chairman and one of the 5 executive directors along with Kong Dan and three others in 1985, which was ratified by the State Council of the People's Republic of China. The State Council ratified the establishment of Everbright by a State Council document numbered No.89 [1983]. (not published to the public).

Due to foreign exchange controls, the main overseas businesses were centered on the Hong Kong-based subsidiary.

Everbright Group founded China Everbright Bank in 1992, the stake in the bank was diluted by the subscription of new shares by Central Huijin Investment in 2007, as well as Everbright Group injected part of the stake of the bank to Everbright Group's subsidiary: China Everbright Limited in 1997.

In 1993 China Everbright Group acquired 20 percent stake of Hong Kong-based International Bank of Asia. (The stake was then injected to China Everbright Limited in 1997, which was sold in 2004).

Everbright Group also acquired several listed companies as reverse IPO to form China Everbright Limited in 1994 (renamed and restructured in 1997) and China Everbright International Limited in 1993.

Everbright Securities was founded in Shanghai in 1996.

In 1998, instead of reporting to the State Council directly, Everbright Group was assigned to the People's Bank of China as the intermediate supervising entity. In 2000, China Securities Regulatory Commission and China Insurance Regulatory Commission were added as the supervisors for the financial businesses, with the Ministry of Finance excising the shareholders rights. State Economic and Trade Commission was also added as the regulator if the business was in the scope of the commission. Lastly, the Committee of Communist Party of China inside the company (the de facto highest board of the company) would be reporting to another supervising minister of the Central Committee of the party. , the former chairman of the group who was arrested in 1999, was jailed in 2002.

In 2007 the group was split into financial and non-financial company, the latter was led by China Everbright Industrial (Group) Co., Ltd., which was owned by Central Huijin from 2007 to 2014 (merged back to China Everbright Group).

In 2014, Central Huijin became a major shareholder of Everbright Group by injecting 90 billion shares of Everbright Bank and 100 percent stake of Everbright Industrial back into Everbright Group. The company also re-incorporated as a joint-stock company with limited liabilities  (as ).

Subsidiaries and equity investments
The company via its wholly owned subsidiary China Everbright Holdings, owned 49.74 percent  stake of China Everbright Limited and 0.18 percent stake of China Everbright Bank. China Everbright Group also owned 29.68% stake of Everbright Securities, 23.96 per cent stake of China Everbright Bank directly. China Everbright Group also owned 41.39 percent stake in Everbright International and 4.98% stake in Shenwan Hongyuan. China Everbright Bank was also owned by Central Huijin Investment, making Everbright Group and Everbright Bank were sister companies.

References

External links
  

 
Government-owned companies of China
Conglomerate companies of China